The Music Bank Chart is a record chart established in 1998 on the South Korean KBS television music program Music Bank. Every week during its live broadcast, the show gives an award for the best-performing single on the South Korean chart. The chart includes digital performance on domestic online music services (65%), album sales (5%), number of times the single was broadcast on KBS TV (20%), and viewers' choice (10%) in its ranking methodology. The score for domestic online music services is calculated using data from Melon, Bugs, Genie Music and Soribada. Laboum member Ahn Sol-bin, who had been hosting the show since July 2016, continued to do so until June 8, 2018. Actor Lee Seo-won, who had been hosting the show alongside Solbin since November 2016 continued to do so till May 11, 2018 when he was removed from his role as a host after it was revealed that he was being investigated for sexual assault and intimidation. For the next four weeks after his departure, VIXX member N, Highlight member Son Dong-woon, Shinee member Taemin and BTS member Kim Seok-jin appeared as guest hosts alongside Solbin. On June 15, Lovelyz member Kei and actor Choi Won-myeong became the new hosts of the show.

In 2018, 36 singles achieved a number one on the chart and 25 music acts were awarded first-place trophies. Of all releases for the year BTS's "Fake Love" acquired the highest point total on the June 1 broadcast with a score of 15,019.

Chart history

References 

2018 in South Korean music
2018 record charts
Lists of number-one songs in South Korea